Ilfred “Tètè” Piar is an international footballer who currently plays for Real Rincon of the Bonaire League  and the Bonaire national football team.

Club career
Piar currently plays for Real Rincon of the Bonaire League. For the 2014 season, he was the league's top goalscorer with 32 goals in 16 matches.

In April 2018 Real Rincon became the first club from Bonaire to compete in CONCACAF international competition as they qualified for the 2018 CONCACAF Caribbean Club Shield. In Real Rincon's opening match, Piar scored a goal as the club defeated Hard Rock FC of Grenada 3–1 in Santiago de los Caballeros, Dominican Republic.

International career
On 14 November 2013, Piar made his international debut for Bonaire against Suriname in the 2013 ABCS Tournament.  This match was also Bonaire's official debut after being accepted as an associate member of CONCACAF and member of the CFU in April 2013. After losing to Suriname in the semi-finals, Bonaire defeated Aruba in the 3rd place match 2–1. Piar opened the scoring against the FIFA side and scored the first official goal for Bonaire after becoming a CFU member.

International goals
Scores and results list Bonaire's goal tally first.

References

Living people
Association football forwards
Bonaire international footballers
1989 births
Bonaire footballers